was a town located in Ayauta District, Kagawa Prefecture, Japan.

As of 2003, the town had an estimated population of 17,183 and a density of 857.86 persons per km². The total area was 20.03 km².

On March 22, 2005, Hanzan, along with the town of Ayauta (also from Ayauta District), was merged into the expanded city of Marugame and no longer exists as an independent municipality.

References

External links
 Official website of Marugame 

Dissolved municipalities of Kagawa Prefecture
Marugame, Kagawa